Pitcairnia staminea is a species of bromeliad in the genus Pitcairnia. This species is endemic to Brazil.

This red-flowered species often hybridizes with the white-flowered Pitcairnia albiflos, producing pink-flowered offspring.

References

External links

staminea
Flora of Brazil